Cadrezzate was a comune (municipality) in the Province of Varese in the Italian region Lombardy, located about  northwest of Milan and about  west of Varese.

In 2019 it merged with the nearby Osmate forming the new municipality of Cadrezzate con Osmate.

Main sights
It was home to one or more prehistoric pile-dwelling (or stilt house) settlements that are part of the Prehistoric Pile dwellings around the Alps UNESCO World Heritage Site.

References
 

 
Cities and towns in Lombardy